Conception is a census-designated place in eastern Nodaway County, Missouri, United States. It is very near Conception Junction (which was the rail intersection). Conception is home to Conception Abbey.

Demographics

History
Conception was built up chiefly by Irish Catholics. The community was named for the Catholic dogma of Immaculate Conception. A post office called Conception has been in operation since 1864. Conception has frequently been noted on lists of unusual place names.

References

Census-designated places in Nodaway County, Missouri